Chester Erskine (November 29, 1905 – April 7, 1986) was an American director, producer, and writer.

Biography 

Chester Erskine was born in Hudson, New York and studied for a short time at the American Academy of Dramatic Arts. His first directing job was Harlem, a 1929 all-black revue. He also directed Spencer Tracy in the Broadway production of The Last Mile in 1930. Erskine's likeness was drawn in caricature by Alex Gard for Sardi's, the New York City theater district restaurant. The picture is now part of the collection of the New York Public Library.

In 1932, he began working in Hollywood, where his best-known work includes the direction of The Egg and I and the screenplay adaptation of All My Sons.

Other films directed by Erskine include the 1949 mystery Take One False Step starring William Powell and the 1952 comedy A Girl in Every Port featuring Groucho Marx.

Erskine produced a number of films, notably The Wonderful Country, a 1959 western with Robert Mitchum.

He died in Beverly Hills, California at the age of 80.

References

External links
 
 
 Chester Erskine papers, 1870-1991 (bulk 1930-1987), held by the Billy Rose Theatre Division, New York Public Library for the Performing Arts

1905 births
1986 deaths
American theatre directors
American theatre managers and producers
American film directors
American film producers
20th-century American businesspeople